Valérie Kaprisky ( Chérès; born 19 August 1962) is a French actress.

Life and career 
She was born Valerie Chérès on 19 August 1962 in Neuilly-sur-Seine. Kaprisky is her Polish mother's maiden name. She is of Greek-Ottoman and Argentine descent on her father's side. When she was eight years old, her family moved to Cannes, where she discovered the Cannes film festival and decided to become an actress. At 17, she moved to Paris, attending high school during the day and the Cours Florent acting school at night.

She appeared in a French erotic movie (Aphrodite), then made her American debut in the À bout de souffle remake Breathless (1983) starring alongside Richard Gere.

She also appeared in La femme publique (1984) by Andrzej Żuławski, for which she was a nominee for the 1985 César Award for Best Actress.

Filmography 

 1981: Le Jour se lève et les conneries commencent
 1981: Les Hommes préfèrent les grosses (Men Prefer Fat Girls): A friend of Éva
 1982: Une glace avec deux boules ou je le dis à maman
 1982: Aphrodite : Pauline
 1982: Légitime violence : Nadine
 1983: Breathless : Monica Poiccard
 1984: La femme publique (The Public Woman): Ethel
 1984: L'Année des méduses (Year of the Jellyfish): Chris
 1986: La Gitane : Mona
 1988: Mon ami le traître : Louise
 1989: Stradivari : Francesca
 1991: Milena : Milena Jesenska
 1991: L'Amérique en otage (TV) : Zaleh
 1993: La Fine è nota : Maria Manni
 1994: Desire in Motion (Mouvements du désir) : Catherine
 1995: Noël et après (TV) : Nicole
 1995: Dis-moi oui... : Nathalie
 1997: L'Enfant du bout du monde (TV) : Alice Valère
 1998: La Dernière des romantiques (TV) : Lise Marie
 1998: Il Tesoro di Damasco (feuilleton TV) : Marie
 1999: Brigade des mineurs (TV) : Laurence Dorlaville
 2000: Toute la ville en parle (TV) : Fabienne Serrant
 2001: Glam : Treasure
 2002: Sentiments partagés (TV) : Lisa
 2003: Fenêtre sur couple : Fany
 2003: Une place parmi les vivants : Maryse
 2003: L'Acqua... il fuoco : Iris
 2004: L'Homme de mon choix (TV) : Camille Rozières
 2004: Moitié-moitié (TV) : Elizabeth Da Silva
 2005: Mon petit doigt m'a dit... : Françoise Blayes
 2005: Jaurès, naissance d'un géant (TV) : Louise
 2005: Galilée (TV) : Marina
 2007: Le Cœur des hommes 2 : Jeanne
 2007: Le Clan Pasquier (TV) : Lucie
 2010: Any Human Heart (miniseries)
 2012: Joséphine, ange gardien TV Series (1 Episode : "Yasmina")
 2014: Salaud, on t'aime : Francia
 2021: The Last Mercenary : Ministre Sivardière

References

External links 

 
 
 

1962 births
Living people
People from Neuilly-sur-Seine
French film actresses
French television actresses
French people of Argentine descent
French people of Turkish descent
French people of Polish descent
French expatriate actresses in the United States
20th-century French actresses
21st-century French actresses
Cours Florent alumni